Swansea Borough Police was a British police force based in Swansea which existed from 1836 to 1969.

History and Amalgamation

The force was formed under Inspector William Rees with six constables. Captain Isaac Colquhoun was the Chief Constable of Swansea from 1877 to 1913. In 1957 there were 272 officers and members of the force.

In 1969 it amalgamated with Cardiff City Police, Glamorgan Constabulary and Merthyr Tydfil Borough Police to form the South Wales Constabulary.

Head of service

References

Footnotes

External links 

 
 

Defunct police forces of Wales
Organisations based in Swansea